The Mayor of Manawatu officiates over the Manawatu District of New Zealand.

Helen Worboys is the current mayor of Manawatu. She was elected in 2016 and re-elected in 2019.

History
Manawatu District was formed through the amalgamation of the former Feilding Borough, Kiwitea County, Manawatu District, Oroua County and Pohangina County Councils in the 1989 local government reforms. The first mayor was Caryll Lydia Mary Clausen, who had previously been on the Feilding Borough Council. Clausen was re-elected in the 1992 local elections and retired for the 1995 elections.  In the 1995 Birthday Honours, Clausen was awarded an MBE for services to local body and community affairs.

Rob Moodie, a former policeman, lawyer, and goat farmer, succeeded Clausen in the 1995 local elections; he narrowly beat Audrey Severinsen, who became deputy mayor. Moodie served for one term and was defeated by Severinsen in the 1998 local elections. Severinsen resigned in 2002 due to ill health and died in February 2003.

Ian McKelvie succeeded Severinsen in a by-election in November 2002. Deputy Mayor Matt Bell was then acting mayor until a by-election held on 7 March 2012. The by-election was narrowly won by Margaret Kouvelis from Feilding, who beat councillor Steven Gibson by just 14 votes (3293 votes to 3279). Worboys won the 2016 election and is the current mayor of Manawatu District. She was re-elected in 2019.

List of mayors of Manawatu
The following list shows the six mayors of Manawatu:

See also
Mayor of Palmerston North
Mayor of Rangitikei

References

Manawatu
Mayors of places in Manawatū-Whanganui
Manawatu District
Mayors of Manawatu
Mayors of districts in New Zealand